The Smith & Wesson Elite Series are break-open shotguns offered by Smith & Wesson circa 2007 to 2010. The shotguns were manufactured at a Smith & Wesson facility in Turkey.

History
In November 2006, Smith & Wesson announced that it would re-enter the shotgun market with two new lines of shotguns, the Elite Series and the semi-automatic 1000 Series, unveiled at the 2007 SHOT Show. Both series were manufactured in Turkey.

The Elite Series was offered in two variants:
 Elite Gold – 20-gauge, side-by-side, barrel lengths 
 Elite Silver – 12-gauge, over-and-under, barrel lengths 26, 28, or 30 in (66, 71, or 76 cm)

Smith & Wesson offered the Elite Series with an "Heirloom Warranty" program, a first of its kind in the firearms industry. The warranty provides both the original buyer and the buyer's chosen heir with a lifetime warranty on all Elite Series shotguns.

The 26-inch Silver offering was discontinued in 2008. The entire Elite Series was discontinued by mid-2010.

References

Further reading

External links
 Smith & Wesson Elite Gold from Carolina Sporting Arms via YouTube

Smith & Wesson firearms
Break-action shotguns
Weapons and ammunition introduced in 2007